Yevgeni Vladimirovich Tatarinov (born 6 February 1999) is a Russian football player. He plays as a centre-forward for FC Ural Yekaterinburg and FC Ural-2 Yekaterinburg.

Club career
He made his debut for the main squad of FC Ural Yekaterinburg on 20 September 2017 in a Russian Cup game against FC Luch-Energiya Vladivostok.

He made his debut in the Russian Professional Football League for FC Ural-2 Yekaterinburg on 4 April 2019 in a game against FC Zenit-Izhevsk.

On 11 July 2019 he joined FC Torpedo Moscow on loan for the 2019–20 season. He made his Russian Football National League debut for Torpedo on 13 July 2019 in a game against FC Baltika Kaliningrad. His loan was terminated early on 11 January 2020.

He made his Russian Premier League debut for Ural on 5 December 2020 in a game against FC Zenit Saint Petersburg, he substituted Pavel Pogrebnyak in the 76th minute.

He scored five goals in nine appearances as a centre forward for Ural 2 in the third tier of Russian football during the 2020–21 season.

Career statistics

References

External links
 
 

1999 births
Sportspeople from Sverdlovsk Oblast
Living people
Russian footballers
Association football forwards
FC Ural Yekaterinburg players
FC Torpedo Moscow players
Russian Premier League players
Russian First League players
Russian Second League players